Thomas Stavngaard (born 7 September 1974) is a Danish badminton player from Lillerød club. He is currently working as a coach for the National badminton team of Denmark.

Achievements

World Senior Championships

European Junior Championships 
Boys' doubles

Mixed doubles

IBF World Grand Prix
The World Badminton Grand Prix was sanctioned by the International Badminton Federation from 1983 to 2006.

Men's doubles

Mixed doubles

IBF International 
Mixed doubles

Men's doubles

References 

1974 births
Living people
Danish male badminton players